Bemersyde is a hamlet in the Mertoun parish of Berwickshire, in the Scottish Borders. It sits on the left bank of the River Tweed, about three miles east of Melrose. Bemersyde House, the ancestral home of the Haig family, is the most notable feature.

Other places nearby include Scott's View, Earlston, St. Boswells, Eildon, Dryburgh, Maxton, Smailholm, Smailholm Tower, and Brotherstone Hill.

See also 
Bemersyde Moss Scottish Wildlife Trust reserve
List of places in the Scottish Borders
List of places in Scotland

External links 
SCRAN resources on Bemersyde
Gazetteer for Scotland: Bemersyde House
GEOGRAPH image: Bemersyde House
Scottish Wildlife Trust: Bemersyde Moss
Napier University: Algae from Bemersyde, 2006
Welcome to Scotland: Bemersyde Moss near Melrose
Scottish Borders Heritage: Bemersyde
Scottish Borders Heritage: Wallace's Statue, Bemersyde
Walking Scotland: Dryburgh Abbey to Scott's View, via Bemersyde House and Gardens, and Bemersyde Hill
Bemersyde Farm

Villages in the Scottish Borders